Brendan Taman is the Director of Pro Personnel for the Ottawa Redblacks of the Canadian Football League (CFL). He has also served as the general manager for the Winnipeg Blue Bombers and Saskatchewan Roughriders. He is a Grey Cup champion having won with the Roughriders as the team's general manager for the 101st Grey Cup in 2013. He attended Aden Bowman Collegiate.

Football operations career
In 1987, Saskatchewan Roughriders director of player personnel Dan Rambo hired Taman as a player personnel assistant. When Rambo and Roughriders offensive coordinator Steve Goldman became general manager and head coach of the Ottawa Rough Riders in 1989, Taman joined them as the team's manager of football operations. He remained in Ottawa until Rambo was fired following the 1992 season. After spending four seasons as Saskatchewan's assistant director of player personnel, Taman became the BC Lions' Director of Player Personnel. In this position he was in charge of scouting, assisted head coach and general manager Adam Rita in handling contracts, and handled much of the day-to-day football operations while Rita focused on coaching. While in BC, Taman signed 1997 and 1998 Jackie Parker Trophy winners B. J. Gallis and Steve Muhammad.

From 1999-2009, Taman worked with the Winnipeg Blue Bombers, first as assistant general manager (1999–2004) and then as general manager (2004–2009). Under his direction, the Blue Bombers had a 39-50-1 record and made an appearance in 95th Grey Cup. Taman was moved from the GM position to the position of Vice President of Player Personnel in late 2008. He stepped down as VP of Player Personnel on January 13, 2009, saying he needed a break from football.

Taman was hired by the Roughriders on June 30, 2009 as director of football administration. Along with head coach Ken Miller and director of player personnel Joe Womack, Taman handled the day-to-day operations of the team while general manager Eric Tillman was on paid administrative leave following sexual assault allegations. Tillman resigned on January 8, 2010  and on January 22, Taman was named as his replacement as general manager. On August 31, 2015, after the Roughriders started 0-9, Taman and head coach Corey Chamblin were relieved of their duties.

On January 24, 2020, it was announced that Taman had joined the Montreal Alouettes as the team's Senior Player Personnel Executive. He spent two years with the Alouettes.

It was announced on January 3, 2022, that Taman had been hired as the Director of Pro Personnel for the Ottawa Redblacks.

CFL GM record

References

External links
Montreal Alouettes bio

1966 births
Living people
Sportspeople from Saskatoon
Winnipeg Blue Bombers general managers
Saskatchewan Roughriders general managers
BC Lions personnel
Ottawa Rough Riders personnel
Winnipeg Blue Bombers personnel
Saskatchewan Roughriders personnel
Montreal Alouettes personnel
Ottawa Redblacks personnel